Events in the year 2019 in Japan.

Incumbents
Emperor: Akihito (until 30 April), Naruhito (since 1 May)
Prime Minister: Shinzō Abe

Governors
Aichi Prefecture: Hideaki Omura
Akita Prefecture: Norihisa Satake
Aomori Prefecture: Shingo Mimura
Chiba Prefecture: Kensaku Morita
Ehime Prefecture: Tokihiro Nakamura
Fukui Prefecture: Issei Nishikawa (until 23 April); Tatsuji Sugimoto (starting 23 April)
Fukuoka Prefecture: Hiroshi Ogawa
Fukushima Prefecture: Masao Uchibori
Gifu Prefecture: Hajime Furuta
Gunma Prefecture: Masaaki Osawa (until 28 July); Ichita Yamamoto (starting 28 July)
Hiroshima Prefecture: Hidehiko Yuzaki
Hokkaido: Harumi Takahashi (until 23 April); Naomichi Suzuki (starting 23 April)
Hyogo Prefecture: Toshizō Ido
Ibaraki Prefecture: Kazuhiko Ōigawa
Ishikawa Prefecture: Masanori Tanimoto
Iwate Prefecture: Takuya Tasso
Kagawa Prefecture: Keizō Hamada
Kagoshima Prefecture: Satoshi Mitazono 
Kanagawa Prefecture: Yuji Kuroiwa
Kochi Prefecture: Masanao Ozaki (until 7 December); Seiji Hamada (starting 7 December)
Kumamoto Prefecture: Ikuo Kabashima
Kyoto Prefecture: Takatoshi Nishiwaki
Mie Prefecture: Eikei Suzuki
Miyagi Prefecture: Yoshihiro Murai
Miyazaki Prefecture: Shunji Kōno
Nagano Prefecture: Shuichi Abe
Nagasaki Prefecture: Hōdō Nakamura 
Nara Prefecture: Shōgo Arai
Niigata Prefecture: Hideyo Hanazumi
Oita Prefecture: Katsusada Hirose
Okayama Prefecture: Ryuta Ibaragi
Okinawa Prefecture: Denny Tamaki
Osaka Prefecture:
 until 20 March: Ichirō Matsui
 20 March-8 April: Hiroyuki Takeuchi
 starting 8 April: Hirofumi Yoshimura
Saga Prefecture: Yoshinori Yamaguchi
Saitama Prefecture: Kiyoshi Ueda (until 31 August); Motohiro Ōno (starting 31 August)
Shiga Prefecture: Taizō Mikazuki
Shiname Prefecture: Zenbe Mizoguchi (until 30 April); Tatsuya Maruyama (starting 30 April)
Shizuoka Prefecture: Heita Kawakatsu
Tochigi Prefecture: Tomikazu Fukuda
Tokushima Prefecture: Kamon Iizumi
Tokyo Prefecture: Yuriko Koike
Tottori Prefecture: Shinji Hirai
Toyama Prefecture: Takakazu Ishii 
Wakayama Prefecture: Yoshinobu Nisaka
Yamagata Prefecture: Mieko Yoshimura
Yamaguchi Prefecture: Tsugumasa Muraoka
Yamanashi Prefecture: Hitoshi Gotō  (until 17 February); Kotaro Nagasaki (starting 17 February)

Events
 2019 Japanese imperial transition
 1 January: It was announced that the new  for the period following Heisei will be released on April 1st.
 8 January: Heisei era's 30th anniversary for the Emperor Shōwa.
 24 February: Jubilee celebrations at the National Theatre of Japan and the 30th anniversary of the death and funeral of Hirohito.
 1 April: It was announced that  is the new federated era for the future Emperor Naruhito, and is expected to be used from May 1st 2019 onwards.
 1 May: Akihito was abdicated as an emperor, Reiwa era begins towards federalism and rise of reformism. 
 22 October: The new federal emperor, Naruhito's enthronement ceremony took place, where he was duly enthroned in an ancient-style proclamation ceremony. 
 10 January: Four of the Japanese films in competition entered the 69th Berlin International Film Festival: Whistleblower by Katsuo Fukuzawa, Snow Flower by Kōjirō Hashimoto, Fortuna's Eye by Takahiro Miki, and Samurai Marathon by Bernard Rose.
 2 April: Two Japan Self-Defence officers are dispatched to a multinational peacekeeping force in Sinai, Egypt.

 26 May: U.S. President Donald Trump, during an official state visit to Japan, is the first foreign leader to meet with emperor Naruhito.
 28 May: According to an official report by the Japan National Police Agency, a stabbing occurred  leaving 2 people dead with 18 injured, ending with the 51 year-old perpetrator committing suicide. The killer attacked bystanders, including elementary school students, waiting for bus near Noborito Station, Kawasaki, Kanagawa Prefecture.
1 June: According to a report authored by the Ministry of Land, Infrastructure, Transport and Tourism of Japan, an accident occurred involving 5-car passenger train running in reverse and colliding with a stopped car in Shin-Sugita Station, Kanagawa Prefecture on the Yokohama Seaside Passenger Line leaving 14  people wounded.
 18 June: 2019 Yamagata earthquake, left 33 people injured. The earthquake, measuring 6.5 on the Richer Scale hit offshore of Tsuruoka, Yamagata Prefecture.
 19 June: According to Ministry of Land, Infrastructure, Transport and Tourism of Japan, a ten car rapid express commuter train derailed in a collision with a car in Odakyu Line, Atsugi, Kanagawa Prefecture, resulting in three people injured.
 20 June:  A textile factory fire occurred in Eiheiji, Fukui Prefecture, leaving four people dead, and another four injured.
 1 July:  Japan announces tightening of high-tech exports to South Korea, effective on 4 July,  thus begin the trade dispute between the two countries.
 18 July: Kyoto Animation arson attack, Kyoto Animation's first studio is set ablaze, with 35 people known to be dead.
 21 July: 2019 Japanese House of Councillors election
 2 August: Japan announces the removal of South Korea from its list of most trusted trading partners, effective on 28 August 2019.
 2019 Pacific typhoon season
 15 August: Typhoon Krosa, total two persons were fatalities, 55 persons were wounded in around western Honshu, according to JFDMA confirmed report. 
 9 September: Typhoon Faxai, according to Japanese Government confirmed report, largely power outage hit in Kanagawa and Chiba Prefecture, 934,000 household affected by transmission line and tower damage in Kisarazu, Chiba Prefecture, with three persons (include two of caused by heatstroke) were death, 147 persons were wounded.
 22 September: Typhoon Tapah, according to JFDMA confirmed report, one person perished, with 68 persons were wounded in nationwide, a tornado hit in Nobeoka, Miyazaki Prefecture.
 4 October: Typhoon Hagibis, according to JFDMA confirmed report, 80 persons killed, 7 persons missing, with 447 persons were wounded in nationwide, a tornado hit in Ichihara, Chiba Prefecture.
 28 August: According to JFDMA confirmed report, flash flood from torrential rain hit in Takeo, Saga Prefecture, resulting in four persons dead. 
 5 September: According to MLIT confirmed report, an eight car commuter train collision with trailer truck at level crossing at Keikyu Line, Kanagawa-ku, Yokohama, resulting to a truck driver losing his life, 30 persons were hurt.
 25 October: According to Japan Meteorological Agency official confirmed report, heavy massive rain 60 to 100 mm per an hour, 160 to 260 mm total 12 hours precipitation, and resulting to debris and flash flood and landslide occurs through Boso Peninsula, Chiba Prefecture, and similar hit in Soma, Fukushima Prefecture. Official death toll is ten, another two persons were missing, according to JFDMA confirmed report.
 31 October: 2019 Shurijo fire, a fire broke down at Shuri Castle, Shuri, Naha, Okinawa Prefecture, later the redevelopment and restoration of building would converted into a new museum after the fire.
 29 November: The oldest living former 1980s prime minister, Yasuhiro Nakasone died, aged 101.

The Nobel Prize
 Akira Yoshino: 2019 Nobel Prize in Chemistry winner.

Arts and entertainment
2019 in anime
2019 in Japanese music
2019 in Japanese television
List of 2019 box office number-one films in Japan
List of Japanese films of 2019

Sports
 October 6 – 2019–20 FIA World Endurance Championship is held at 2019 6 Hours of Fuji
 October 13 – 2019 Formula One World Championship is held at 2019 Japanese Grand Prix
 October 20 – 2019 MotoGP World Championship is held at 2019 Japanese motorcycle Grand Prix

 2019 F4 Japanese Championship
 2019 Japanese Formula 3 Championship
 2019 Super Formula Championship
 2019 Super GT Series

 2019 AFC Champions League (Japan)
 2019 in Japanese football
 2019 J1 League
 2019 J2 League
 2019 J3 League
 2019 Japan Football League
 2019 Japanese Regional Leagues
 2019 Japanese Super Cup
 2019 Emperor's Cup
 2019 J.League Cup

Deaths

January
 January 12 –  Etsuko Ichihara, actress (b. 1936)
 January 30 – Shigeichi Nagano, photographer (b. 1925)

February
 February 1 – Kinryū Arimoto, voice actor (b. 1940)
 February 5 – Fumiko Hori, Nihonga painter (b. 1918)
 February 9 – Junya Sato, film director (b. 1932)
 February 10 – Kōji Kitao, sumo wrestler (b. 1963)
 February 24 – Donald Keene, scholar (b. 1922)

March
 March 17 – Yuya Uchida, singer (b. 1939)
 March 26 – Kenichi Hagiwara, actor (b. 1950)
 March 28 – Fuyumi Shiraishi, voice actress (b. 1936)

April
 April 5 – Wowaka, musician (b. 1987)
 April 11 – Monkey Punch, manga artist (b. 1937)
 April 16 – Kiyoshi Kawakubo, voice actor (b. 1929)

May
 May 12 – Machiko Kyō, actress (b. 1924)
20 May – Yasuo Furuhata, film director (b. 1934)

June
 June 3 – Atsushi Aoki, Japanese professional wrestler (b. 1977)
 June 6 – Seiko Tanabe, author (b. 1928)
 June 10 – Yuzuru Fujimoto, voice actor (b. 1935)
 June 12 – Tsuruko Yamazaki, artist (b. 1925)
 June 26 – Tadao Takashima, actor (b. 1930)

July
 July 9 – Johnny Kitagawa, businessman (b. 1931)
 July 18 – Yukiya Amano, diplomat (b. 1947)
 July 28 – Yū Shimaka, voice actor (b. 1949)

September
 September 2 – George Abe, author (b. 1937)
 September 16 – Sakahoko Nobushige, sumo wrestler (b. 1961)

October
 October 6 – Masaichi Kaneda, baseball pitcher (b. 1933)
 October 13 – Kanako Naito, volleyball player (b. 1980)
 October 24 – Kaoru Yachigusa, actress (b. 1931)
 October 29 – Sadako Ogata, diplomat, professor (b. 1927)

November
 November 11 – Tadashi Nakamura, voice actor (b. 1929)
 November 12 – Mitsuhisa Taguchi, Japanese footballer (b. 1955)
 November 13 – Yukihiro Takiguchi, actor (b. 1985)
 November 18 – Midori Kiuchi, actress (b. 1950)
 November 29
Yasuhiro Nakasone, 45th Prime Minister of Japan (b. 1918)
Makio Inoue, voice actor (b. 1938)

December
 December 4
Tetsu Nakamura, physician (b. 1946)
Akira Hayami, professor (b. 1929)
 December 12 – Tatsuo Umemiya, actor (b. 1938)
 December 19 – Yoshio Mochizuki, politician (b. 1947)

References

 
2010s in Japan
Years of the 21st century in Japan
Japan
Japan